"Summer of Love" is a dance-pop song performed by Australian singer-songwriter Dannii Minogue. The Extended Mix of the song was released worldwide on March 7, 2015 and features a rap section by British rapper Reece.

Background
In February 2015, Dannii Minogue announced that, after a long hiatus, she planned to make her musical comeback on Sydney Gay and Lesbian Mardi Gras. Minogue also revealed she had been working on new music.

Following the announcement, Minogue, Reece and the official Sydney Mardi Gras profiles launched a mysterious online campaign on social media featuring the #pressplay hashtag. Finally, at the end of February, Sydney Mardi Gras shared a YouTube link to a video called #pressplay, featuring the Extended Mix of "Summer of Love".

On March 2, the Extended Mix of "Summer of Love" was made available as a pre-order single on iTunes.

Formats and track listings
These are the formats and track listings of major single releases of "Summer of Love".

Single 
"Summer of Love" (Extended Mix) – 5:01

Remixes – EP 
"Summer of Love" (Extended Mix Without Rap) – 5:01
"Summer of Love" (Rich B & Phil Marriot Club Mix) – 6:26
"Summer of Love" (Seamus Haji Remix) – 6:27
"Summer of Love" (As I Am Remix) – 5:15

Official Remixes
"Summer of Love" (Rich B & Phil Marriott Radio Edit) – 3:28

Personnel
The following people contributed to "Summer of Love":

Dannii Minogue – lead vocals
Reece Robertson – rap
Tom Diesel – songwriter, production
Ron E. Jones – songwriter, additional vocals
Ian Masterson for Thriller Jill – mixing, remix and additional production 
Terry Ronald – additional vocals
Mitch Stevens – additional vocals
Jodie Ward – artwork
Sue Alali – lyric video
Wally Crayon – cover art

References

2015 singles
2015 songs
Dannii Minogue songs